American singer-songwriter China Anne McClain has released three soundtrack albums, four singles, one promotional single, and four music videos. McClain appeared on the A.N.T. Farm soundtrack album in 2011, which was on the Billboard 200 at number 29, with songs such as Taio Cruz's "Dynamite" and "Calling All the Monsters". In 2014, McClain had released "Something Real", along with Kelli Berglund, the main single of the Disney Channel original movie How to Build a Better Boy.

Albums

Soundtrack albums

Singles

As main artist

Promotional singles

Other charted songs

Other appearances

Music videos

Notes

References

Pop music discographies
Discographies of American artists